Cheiranthera brevifolia, is a small upright, sparsely branched shrub. It grows in gravelly sand, laterite and granite on undulating hillsides near Esperance and Albany in Western Australia.

References 

Pittosporaceae
Apiales of Australia
Flora of Western Australia
Taxa named by Ferdinand von Mueller